Are You a Mason? is a farce in 3 acts by Leo Ditrichstein, who in turn adapted it from a German play, Die Logenbrüder (The Freemason), by Curt Kraatz and Carl Laufs.  The play was performed at the Shaftesbury Theatre in 1901.

The play has been adapted for screen:
 Are You a Mason? (1934 film), a 1934 British comedy film
 Are You a Mason? (1915 film), a 1915 silent comedy film
A 1922  adaptation was planned for Roscoe "Fatty" Arbuckle but was dropped  due to the Virginia Rappe murder scandal.

References

1901 plays
Plays adapted into films